Saint Jean Hulst, founded in 1878, is a secondary school located in Versailles (France). The old name, Saint Jean de Béthune, is still often seen and used.
The school has more than 3,000 students from collège (the first four years of secondary education in France) to lyceum. It is known for its Baccalauréat results: 100% accepted from 2006 to 2014.
It was also the third largest contributor of students to the Instituts d'études politiques (SciencesPo) in 2009.

Famous alumni

19th century 
 Georges Lacombe (1868-1916), sculptor
 Henri Émilien Rousseau (1875-1933), painter
 Henri Marret (1878-1964), painter
 Paul Richaud (1887-1968), Catholic Cardinal
 Jacques de La Presle (1888-1969), composer
   (1899-1967), missionary and Prelate
 Emmanuel d'Astier de La Vigerie (1900-1969), journalist and politician

1901-1950 
 René Voillaume (1905-2003), priest and theologian
 Jehan Alain (1911-1940), organist and composer
  Armand-François Le Bourgeois (1911-2005), Bishop
 Maurice Teynac (1915-1992), actor
  (1916-1987), writer and journalist
 Antoine de La Garanderie (1920-2010), educator and philosopher
  (1921-2001), cyberneticist
  (1929- ), comedian
  (1933- ), journalist
 Gilles de Robien (1941- ), politician
   (1942- ), Bishop
  (1947- ), journalist
  (1947- ), composer
 Erik Arnoult, known as Érik Orsenna (1947- ), politician and novelist
 Henry de Lesquen (1949- ), politician

1951-2000 
 Bruno Guiblet (1951- ), novelist
  (1960- ), comedian
 François de Mazières (1960- ), politician
  (1961- ), journalist
  (1962- ), government official
 Étienne de Montety (1965- ), writer and journalist

Lycées in Yvelines
Schools in France
Educational institutions established in 1878
1878 establishments in France